The blackberry is an edible fruit produced by many species in the genus Rubus in the family Rosaceae, hybrids among these species within the subgenus Rubus, and hybrids between the subgenera Rubus and Idaeobatus. The taxonomy of blackberries has historically been confused because of hybridization and apomixis, so that species have often been grouped together and called species aggregates. For example, the entire subgenus Rubus has been called the Rubus fruticosus aggregate, although the species R. fruticosus is considered a synonym of R. plicatus. 

Rubus armeniacus ("Himalayan" blackberry) is considered a noxious weed and invasive species in many regions of the Pacific Northwest of Canada and the United States, where it grows out of control in urban and suburban parks and woodlands.

Description
What distinguishes the blackberry from its raspberry relatives is whether or not the torus (receptacle or stem) "picks with" (i.e., stays with) the fruit. When picking a blackberry fruit, the torus stays with the fruit. With a raspberry, the torus remains on the plant, leaving a hollow core in the raspberry fruit.

The term bramble, a word referring to any impenetrable thicket, has in some circles traditionally been applied specifically to the blackberry or its products, though in the United States it applies to all members of the genus Rubus. In small parts of the western US, the term caneberry is used to refer to blackberries and raspberries as a group rather than the term bramble. Briar or brier is also sometimes used to refer to the plant, though this name is used for other thorny thickets (such as Smilax) as well.

The usually black fruit is not a berry in the botanical sense of the word. Botanically it is termed an aggregate fruit, composed of small drupelets. It is a widespread and well-known group of over 375 species, many of which are closely related apomictic microspecies native throughout Europe, northwestern Africa, temperate western and central Asia and North and South America.

Botanical characteristics

Blackberries are perennial plants which typically bear biennial stems ("canes") from the perennial root system.

In its second year, the cane becomes a floricane and the stem does not grow longer, but the lateral buds break to produce flowering laterals (which have smaller leaves with three or five leaflets). First- and second-year shoots usually have numerous short-curved, very sharp prickles that are often erroneously called thorns. These prickles can tear through denim with ease and make the plant very difficult to navigate around. Prickle-free cultivars have been developed. The University of Arkansas has developed primocane-fruiting blackberries that grow and flower on first-year growth as much as the primocane-fruiting (also called fall bearing or everbearing) red raspberries do.

Unmanaged mature plants form a tangle of dense arching stems, the branches rooting from the node tip on many species when they reach the ground. Vigorous and growing rapidly in woods, scrub, hillsides, and hedgerows, blackberry shrubs tolerate poor soils, readily colonizing wasteland, ditches, and vacant lots.

The flowers are produced in late spring and early summer on short racemes on the tips of the flowering laterals.

The drupelets only develop around ovules that are fertilized by the male gamete from a pollen grain. The most likely cause of undeveloped ovules is inadequate pollinator visits. Even a small change in conditions, such as a rainy day or a day too hot for bees to work after early morning, can reduce the number of bee visits to the flower, thus reducing the quality of the fruit. Incomplete drupelet development can also be a symptom of exhausted reserves in the plant's roots or infection with a virus such as raspberry bushy dwarf virus.

History

One of the earliest known instances of blackberry consumption comes from the remains of the Haraldskær Woman, the naturally preserved bog body of a Danish woman dating from approximately 2,500 years ago. Forensic evidence found blackberries in her stomach contents, among other foods. The use of blackberries to make wines and cordials was documented in the London Pharmacopoeia in 1696. In the culinary world, blackberries have a long history of use alongside other fruits to make pies, jellies and jams.

Blackberry plants were used for traditional medicine by Greeks, other European peoples, and aboriginal Americans. A 1771 document described brewing blackberry leaves, stem, and bark for stomach ulcers.

Blackberry fruit, leaves, and stems have been used to dye fabrics and hair. Native Americans have even been known to use the stems to make rope. The shrubs have also been used for barriers around buildings, crops and livestock. The wild plants have sharp, thick prickles, which offered some protection against enemies and large animals.

Cultivar development
Modern hybridization and cultivar development took place mostly in the United States. In 1880, a hybrid blackberry-raspberry named the loganberry was developed in Santa Cruz, California, by an American judge and horticulturalist, James Harvey Logan. One of the first thornless varieties was developed in 1921, but the berries lost much of their flavor. Common thornless cultivars developed from the 1990s to the early 21st century by the US Department of Agriculture enabled efficient machine-harvesting, higher yields, larger and firmer fruit, and improved flavor, including the Triple Crown, Black Diamond, Black Pearl, and Nightfall, a marionberry.

Ecology

Blackberry leaves are food for certain caterpillars; some grazing mammals, especially deer, are also very fond of the leaves. Caterpillars of the concealer moth Alabonia geoffrella have been found feeding inside dead blackberry shoots. When mature, the berries are eaten and their seeds dispersed by mammals, such as the red fox, American black bear and the Eurasian badger, as well as by small birds.

Blackberries grow wild throughout most of Europe. They are an important element in the ecology of many countries, and harvesting the berries is a popular pastime. However, their rigorous growth and tendency to grow unchecked if not managed correctly means that the plants are also considered a weed, sending down roots from branches that touch the ground, and sending up suckers from the roots. In some parts of the world, such as in Australia, Chile, New Zealand, and the Pacific Northwest of North America, some blackberry species, particularly Rubus armeniacus (Himalayan blackberry) and Rubus laciniatus (evergreen blackberry), are naturalized and considered an invasive species and a noxious weed.

Blackberry fruits are red when unripe, leading to an old expression that "blackberries are red when they're green".

Uses

Nutrients

Raw blackberries are 88% water, 10% carbohydrates, 1% protein, and 0.5% fat (table). In a  reference amount, raw cultivated blackberries supply 43 calories and rich contents (20% or more of the Daily Value (DV) of dietary fiber, manganese (31% DV), vitamin C (25% DV), and vitamin K (19% DV) (table).

Seed composition
Blackberries contain numerous large seeds that are not always preferred by consumers. The seeds contain oil rich in omega-3 (alpha-linolenic acid) and omega-6 (linoleic acid) fats as well as protein, dietary fiber, carotenoids, ellagitannins, and ellagic acid.

Culinary use
The ripe fruit is commonly used in desserts, jams, jelly, wine and liqueurs. It may be mixed with other berries and fruits for pies and crumbles. Blackberries are also used to produce candy.

Phytochemical research
Blackberries contain numerous phytochemicals including polyphenols, flavonoids, anthocyanins, salicylic acid, ellagic acid, and fiber. Anthocyanins in blackberries are responsible for their rich dark color. One report placed blackberries at the top of more than 1,000 polyphenol-rich foods consumed in the United States, but this concept of a health benefit from consuming dark-colored foods like blackberries remains scientifically unverified and not accepted for health claims on food labels.

Cultivation
Worldwide, Mexico is the leading producer of blackberries, with nearly the entire crop being produced for export into the off-season fresh markets in North America and Europe. Until 2018, the Mexican market was almost entirely based on the cultivar 'Tupy' (often spelled 'Tupi', but the EMBRAPA program in Brazil from which it was released prefers the 'Tupy' spelling), but Tupy fell out of favor in some Mexican growing regions.

Numerous cultivars have been selected for commercial and amateur cultivation in Europe and the United States. Since the many species form hybrids easily, there are numerous cultivars with more than one species in their ancestry.

Hybrids

'Marion' (marketed as "marionberry") is an important cultivar that was selected from seedlings from a cross between 'Chehalem' and 'Olallie' (commonly called "Olallieberry") berries. 'Olallie' in turn is a cross between loganberry and youngberry. 'Marion', 'Chehalem' and 'Olallie' are just three of many trailing blackberry cultivars developed by the United States Department of Agriculture Agricultural Research Service (USDA-ARS) blackberry breeding program at Oregon State University in Corvallis, Oregon.

The most recent cultivars released from this program are the prickle-free cultivars 'Black Diamond', 'Black Pearl', and 'Nightfall' as well as the very early-ripening 'Obsidian' and 'Metolius'. 'Black Diamond' is now the leading cultivar being planted in the Pacific Northwest. Some of the other cultivars from this program are 'Newberry', 'Waldo', 'Siskiyou', 'Black Butte', 'Kotata', 'Pacific', and 'Cascade'.

Trailing 
Trailing blackberries are vigorous and crown-forming, require a trellis for support, and are less cold-hardy than the erect or semi-erect blackberries. In addition to the Pacific Northwest, these types do well in similar climates, such as the United Kingdom, New Zealand, Chile, and the Mediterranean countries.

Thornless
Semi-erect, prickle-free blackberries were first developed at the John Innes Centre in Norwich, UK, and subsequently by the USDA-ARS in Beltsville, Maryland. These are crown forming and very vigorous and need a trellis for support. Cultivars include 'Black Satin', 'Chester Thornless', 'Dirksen Thornless', 'Hull Thornless', 'Loch Maree', 'Loch Ness', 'Loch Tay', 'Merton Thornless', 'Smoothstem', and 'Triple Crown'. 'Loch Ness' and 'Loch Tay' have gained the RHS's Award of Garden Merit. The cultivar 'Cacanska Bestrna' (also called 'Cacak Thornless') has been developed in Serbia and has been planted on many thousands of hectares there.

Erect
The University of Arkansas has developed cultivars of erect blackberries. These types are less vigorous than the semi-erect types and produce new canes from root initials (therefore they spread underground like raspberries). There are prickly and prickle-free cultivars from this program, including 'Navaho', 'Ouachita', 'Cherokee', 'Apache', 'Arapaho', and 'Kiowa'. They are also responsible for developing the primocane fruiting blackberries such as 'Prime-Jan' and 'Prime-Jim'.

Primocane
In raspberries, these types are called primocane fruiting, fall fruiting, or everbearing. 'Prime-Jim' and 'Prime-Jan' were released in 2004 by the University of Arkansas and are the first cultivars of primocane fruiting blackberry. They grow much like the other erect cultivars described above; however, the canes that emerge in the spring will flower in midsummer and fruit in late summer or fall. The fall crop has its highest quality when it ripens in cool mild climate such as in California or the Pacific Northwest.

'Illini Hardy', a semi-erect prickly cultivar introduced by the University of Illinois, is cane hardy in zone 5, where blackberry production has traditionally been problematic, since canes often failed to survive the winter.

Mexico and Chile
Blackberry production in Mexico expanded considerably in the early 21st century. In 2017, Mexico had 97% of the market share for fresh blackberries imported into the United States, while Chile had 61% of the market share for American imports of frozen blackberries.

While once based on the cultivar 'Brazos', an old erect blackberry cultivar developed in Texas in 1959, the Mexican industry is now dominated by the Brazilian 'Tupy' released in the 1990s. The 'Tupy' has the erect blackberry 'Comanche', and a "wild Uruguayan blackberry" as parents. Since there are no native blackberries in Uruguay, the suspicion is that the widely grown 'Boysenberry' is the male parent. In order to produce these blackberries in regions of Mexico where there is no winter chilling to stimulate flower bud development, chemical defoliation and application of growth regulators are used to bring the plants into bloom.

Diseases and pests

Because blackberries belong to the same genus as raspberries, they share the same diseases, including anthracnose, which can cause the berry to have uneven ripening. Sap flow may also be slowed. They also share the same remedies, including the Bordeaux mixture, a combination of lime, water and copper(II) sulfate. The rows between blackberry plants must be free of weeds, blackberry suckers and grasses, which may lead to pests or diseases. Fruit growers are selective when planting blackberry bushes because wild blackberries may be infected, and gardeners are recommended to purchase only certified disease-free plants.

The spotted-wing drosophila, Drosophila suzukii, is a serious pest of blackberries. Unlike its vinegar fly relatives, which are primarily attracted to rotting or fermented fruit, D. suzukii attacks fresh, ripe fruit by laying eggs under the soft skin. The larvae hatch and grow in the fruit, destroying the fruit's commercial value.

Another pest is Amphorophora rubi, known as the blackberry aphid, which eats not just blackberries but raspberries as well.

Byturus tomentosus (raspberry beetle), Lampronia corticella (raspberry moth) and Anthonomus rubi (strawberry blossom weevil) are also known to infest blackberries.

Genetics
The loci controlling the primocane fruiting was mapped in the F Locus, on LG7, whereas thorns/thornlessness was mapped on LG4. Better understanding of the genetics is useful for genetic screening of cross-breds, and for genetic engineering purposes.

Folklore
Folklore in the United Kingdom and Ireland tells that blackberries should not be picked after Old Michaelmas Day (11 October) as the devil (or a Púca) has made them unfit to eat by stepping, spitting or fouling on them. There is some value in this legend as autumn's wetter and cooler weather often allows the fruit to become infected by various molds such as Botryotinia which give the fruit an unpleasant look and may be toxic. According to some traditions, a blackberry's deep purple color represents Christ's blood and the crown of thorns was made of brambles, although other thorny plants, such as Crataegus (hawthorn) and Euphorbia milii (crown of thorns plant), have been proposed as the material for the crown.

See also
 Pacific blackberry, a North American species of blackberry
 Mulberry, similar fruit appearance, but a tree rather than a bramble
 List of Lepidoptera that feed on Rubus
 Redberry mite, a common pest of North American blackberry crops

References

Further reading

External links

 

Berries
Medicinal plants
Plant common names
Rubus